Zhong County or Zhongxian is a county of Chongqing Municipality, China.

The Shibaozhai Temple, which is endangered by the rising waters caused by the Three Gorges Dam, is located there.

Zhong County has two Yangtze River crossings: the Zhongxian Yangtze River Bridge and Zhongzhou Yangtze River Bridge.

History
Linjiang County (临江县) was established under Ba Commandery (巴郡) in Han Dynasty. In Western Wei, Lin Prefecture (临州, Linzhou) was established, with Linjiang as its seat. In Tang Dynasty, it was renamed as Zhong Prefecture (忠州, Zhongzhou, literally "loyal prefecture"). In 1913, Zhongzhou was replaced by Zhong County.

Climate

References

External links

Official website of Zhong County

County-level divisions of Chongqing